Hills make up some 24% of Porto Alegre's area. Median height of Porto Alegre's hills is 147 meters (482.28 ft).

List of Hills

Sources

 "Morros." Prefeitura de Porto Alegre. 23 Sept. 2006

Hills of Brazil
hills